Ekbom is a Swedish surname. Notable people with the surname include:
 
 Selim Ekbom (1807–1886), Finnish politician
 Viktor Ekbom (born 1989), Swedish ice hockey player
 Karl-Axel Ekbom (1907–1977), Swedish neurologist

Swedish-language surnames